Taufiq Kasrun (born 12 October 1985) is an Indonesian professional footballer who plays as a centre-back for Liga 2 club PSKC Cimahi.

Club career

Hizbul Wathan FC
In 2021, Kasrun signed a contract with Indonesian Liga 2 club Hizbul Wathan. He made his league debut on 27 September against Persijap Jepara. On 25 October 2021, Kasrun scored his first goal for Hizbul Wathan against PSG Pati in the 11th minute at the Manahan Stadium, Surakarta.

Honours

Club
Sriwijaya
Indonesian Inter Island Cup: 2012

References

External links
 Taufiq Kasrun at Soccerway

1985 births
Association football defenders
Living people
Indonesian footballers
Liga 1 (Indonesia) players
Persela Lamongan players
Persitara Jakarta Utara players
Footballers at the 2006 Asian Games
Asian Games competitors for Indonesia
People from Lamongan Regency
Sportspeople from East Java